Rainer Köttstorfer (born 2 August 1981) is a former German professional ice hockey defenceman. He most recently played for Grizzly Adams Wolfsburg of the Deutsche Eishockey Liga (DEL).

On 9 February 2011, Köttstorfer signed a one-year extension with the Hamburg Freezers to remain through to the 2011–12 season. Upon completion of the season and as a free agent, Rainer signed a one-year contract with Grizzly Adams Wolfsburg on July 10, 2012. He only played 7 games before he retired as a result of an injury.

Career statistics

Regular season and playoffs

International

References

External links
 

1981 births
Living people
Grizzlys Wolfsburg players
Hamburg Freezers players
Hannover Scorpions players
Krefeld Pinguine players
German ice hockey defencemen
People from Rosenheim
Sportspeople from Upper Bavaria